Elections to Newport City Council were held on 5 May 2022 along with elections to the other 21 local authorities in Wales, community council elections in Wales and 2022 United Kingdom local elections. The previous full council election took place in May 2017, though there had also been a number of by-elections in the city in the intervening period.

Background
The Labour Party had controlled Newport since 2012 and the Liberal Democrats, Conservatives and independents were hoping to make some inroads at this election.

Following an electoral boundary review, the overall number of electoral wards increased from 20 to 21, with the total number of councillors increasing by one, from 50 to 51. The former Rogerstone ward was split into three while the Tredegar Park and Marshfield ward were merged. The Langstone, Llanwern and Lliswerry wards were substantially reconfigured.

Results summary

Ward results
An asterix indicates the candidate is a sitting councillor for the ward standing for re-election.

Allt-yr-yn

Alway

Beechwood

Bettws

Bishton and Langstone

 
 
 
 

 

Routley and Mogford had been the sitting councillors for the former Langstone ward, which had the Bishton community added at this election.

Caerleon

Gaer

Graig

Llanwern

Lliswerry

 
 
 
 
 

 

The community of Nash was transferred from Liswerry to the Llanwern ward at this election.

Malpas

Pillgwenlly

Ringland

Rogerstone East

Rogerstone North

Rogerstone West

 
 
 

 

Forsey had been one of the sitting councillors in the former Rogerstone ward.

Shaftesbury

 
 
 
 
 

 

James became Newport's first ever Green Party councillor.

St Julian's

Stow Hill

Tredegar Park and Marshfield

 
 
 
 
 
 

 

Watkins had been the sitting councillor for the former Tredegar Park ward.

Victoria

 
 
 
 
 

 

Horton and Hussain had won seats in this ward at two separate by-elections in 2021.

References

2022 Welsh local elections
2022